Rohnke Crests are two rock ridges (about 1400 m) that are parallel and rise above the general ice mantle on the southeast slopes of Mount Terror, Ross Island. This feature is east of the head of Eastwind Glacier and 4 nautical miles (7 km) northeast of Conical Hill. Names in association with Eastwind Glacier after Captain (later R.Adm.) Oscar C. Rohnke, USCG, who commanded USCGC Eastwind in Ross Sea during U.S. Navy Operation Deepfreeze I, 1955–56.
 

Ridges of Ross Island